PortAventura World is an entertainment resort in Salou and Vila-seca, Tarragona, on the Costa Daurada in Catalonia, Spain. It was built around the PortAventura Park theme park, which attracts around 3.5 million visitors per year, making it the most visited theme park in Spain and the sixth most visited theme park in Europe. The resort includes a second theme park, Ferrari Land, since 2017 and also includes PortAventura Caribe Aquatic Park, six hotels, a convention centre and an RV park. It is the biggest resort in the south of Europe which attracts around five million visitors per year. Reus Airport lies within 15 minutes driving distance and Barcelona Airport within one hour. The train station Salou - Port Aventura is 750m from the resort entrance, and is served by line R17 trains to Barcelona and Tarragona.

History
When Port Aventura opened in 1995 in Salou, The Tussauds Group owned 40.0% of the park while La Caixa had 33.2%, Anheuser-Busch had 19.9%, and FECSA had 6.7%. In 1998 the majority of Tussauds Group's shares in the park were sold to Universal and the park was rebranded as 'Universal's Port Aventura', which made it the first Universal Studios Theme Park in Europe.

In 2002, a water park (Costa Caribe) and two hotels (Hotel PortAventura and Hotel El Paso) were constructed, and the resort was further rebranded as 'Universal Mediterranea'. In 2004, NBCUniversal (Universal Studios' parent) sold all interest in PortAventura. It is owned and operated by La Caixa banking group's investment vehicle Criteria, but as of 2005 the Universal name has been dropped from the branding, and the resort was once again named 'PortAventura' (the space in the name is deliberately left out for trademark reasons). In 2009, the resort hosted 3,310,000 visitors.

In December 2013, private equity firm KKR picked up 49.9% stake in PortAventura from Investindustrial, which still owned 50.1%. In 2016 the resort was renamed as 'PortAventura World Parks & Resort'. The second theme park, Ferrari Land, was inaugurated on 7 April 2017. PortAventura Dream Village, an exclusive vacation for guests with additional needs, opened in 2017.

PortAventura Park

The park features five theme areas based on civilizations (Mediterrània, Far West, México, China and Polynesia), and one theme area based on Sesame Street. Mediterrània is the main entrance area of the park.
Main rides
 Furius Baco, an Intamin Accelerator Coaster with winged seating, which opened in June 2007. It has a top speed of 83.9 mph (135 km/h).
 Stampida, a dueling wooden roller coaster.
 Tomahawk, a junior version of Stampida and which runs parallel to it.
 Silver River Flume, a traditional log flume.
 Grand Canyon Rapids, a whitewater river rapids ride along the Grand Canyon.
 Hurakan Condor, an Intamin drop tower ride. This ride is one of the tallest in the world at 330 ft.
 El Diablo – Tren de la Mina, an Arrow Dynamics mine train roller coaster. The top speed of the coaster is around 60 km/h.
 Dragon Khan, with 8 inversions this formerly held the record as having more inversions than any other roller coaster. It also held the world record for the tallest vertical loop on any roller-coaster. The ride built by Bolliger & Mabillard was one of the two roller coasters that Port Aventura had when it opened. It consistently ranks among the world's best roller coasters in polls.
 Shambhala, this B&M hypercoaster beat three European records as it was the fastest (134 km/h) and tallest roller coaster in Europe. It is 76 m tall and had longest drop in Europe at 78 m (2 m underground).
 Angkor, a large splash battle themed in the Angkor ruins that opened in 2014.
 Tutuki Splash, a Shoot the Chute themed along an erupting volcano.
 Tami Tami, a roller coaster for children.
 Street Mission, an interactive Sesame Street dark ride.

Ferrari Land

InvestIndustrial and Ferrari signed a deal to build a new area themed to the Italian sports car brand in the PortAventura resort covering 60,000 m2, including new rides, restaurants, shops and car racing simulators. Ferrari Land is the resort's second theme park, separate from PortAventura Park. Its entrance is adjacent to PortAventura Park's main entrance. The Mediterranean theme is common to both entrances, as Ferrari Land is inspired by Italy, including recreations of Venice's Piazza San Marco and Rome's Colosseum. The main ride of Ferrari Land is Red Force, a 112 m tall vertical accelerator coaster that surpassed Shambhala as the tallest coaster in Europe and is also the fastest coaster in Europe. The park was opened on 7 April 2017, after an investment of more than €100 million. Ferrari Land opened a kids area in 2018.

Ferrari Land is the second amusement centre themed to Ferrari in the world, after Ferrari World Abu Dhabi.

Partial list of rides and attractions

Roller coasters

Flat rides

Water rides

Amusement rides using motion pictures

PortAventura Caribe Aquatic Park

PortAventura Caribe Aquatic Park is a water park which is adjacent to PortAventura Park. It has an area of 50,000 m2, which includes 16 attractions and slides, as well as over 8,500 m2 of water-covered surface area. It is themed to the Caribbean, with beaches, palm trees, and Latin and reggae music, and it also includes shops and restaurants.

The park has been closed due to the coronavirus outbreak and currently is remaining closed throughout 2020.

Rides
 King Khajuna – Europe's tallest free-fall slide of 31 meters and 55-degree descent by ProSlide. Opened in 2013.
 Ciclón Tropical – MultiBUMP slide by ProSlide opened in 2013.
 Rapid Race – ProSlide ProRacer opened in 2013.
 The Mambo and Limbo – Two corkscrew waterslides by ProSlide. Opened in 2002.
 El Tifón – Two ProSlide body waterslides opened in 2002.
 El Río Loco – Lazy River opened in 2002.
 El Torrente – A ProSlide Mammoth river with four-passenger round tubes, opened in 2002.
 Barracudas – A pair of ProSlide tube chutes with two-passenger inline tubes, opened in 2002.

Kids rides
 Zona Indoor with Junior Slides – Indoor play area including pool and slides by WhiteWater West. Opened in 2002.
 La Laguna de Woody – Woody Woodpecker-themed play area by WhiteWater West. Opened in 2002.

Resort hotels
The resort features six themed hotels:

 PortAventura Hotel PortAventura: Mediterranean theme (4*)
 PortAventura Hotel Caribe: Caribbean theme (4*)
 PortAventura Hotel El Paso: Mexican theme (4*)
 PortAventura Hotel Gold River (including 'The Callaghan's'): Western theme (4*)
 PortAventura Hotel Colorado Creek: Rustic Western theme (4*)
 PortAventura Hotel Mansión de Lucy: Victorian-style Western theme (5*)
 Hotel Ferrari: Ferrari theme (5*) (future)

Seasonal events

During seasonal events like summer nights, Halloween (September to November) and Christmas (November to January), PortAventura Park opens seasonal walkaround rides or shows, including the mazes: [REC], Horror in Penitence, La Selva del Miedo and the nighttime Halloween show Horror en el Lago.

See also
Incidents at European amusement parks

References

External links

  – Official English site

Kohlberg Kravis Roberts companies
 
1995 establishments in Spain